This is a list of Oakland, California elementary schools. The list includes current and former schools, public, and charter. Oakland's public elementary schools are part of the Oakland Unified School District.

District-run Public schools

 Acorn Woodland Elementary School
 Allendale Elementary School
 Bella Vista Elementary School
 Bridges Academy
 Brookfield Elementary School
 Burckhalter Elementary School
 Carl B. Munck Elementary School
 Chabot Elementary School
 Cleveland Elementary School
 Crocker Highlands Elementary School
 East Oakland Pride Elementary School
 Emerson Elementary School
 Encompass Academy
 Esperanza Elementary School
 Franklin Elementary School
 Fred T. Korematsu Discovery Academy
 Fruitvale Elementary School
 Garfield Elementary School
 Glenview Elementary School
 Global Family School
 Grass Valley Elementary School
 Greenleaf Elementary School
 Hillcrest Elementary School
 Hoover Elementary School
 Horace Mann Elementary School
 (Charles P.) Howard Elementary School
 International Community School
 Joaquin Miller Elementary School
 La Escuelita Elementary School
 Lafayette Elementary School
 Laurel Elementary School
 Lincoln Elementary School
 Lockwood STEAM Academy
 Madison Park Academy Primary
 Manzanita Community School
 Manzanita Seed
 Markham Elementary School
 Martin Luther King, Jr. Elementary School
 Melrose Leadership Academy
 Montclair Elementary
 New Highland Academy
Peralta Elementary School
 Piedmont Avenue Elementary School
 Prescott School
 Reach Academy
 Redwood Heights Elementary School
 Rise Community School
 Sankofa United
 Sequoia Elementary School
 Sobrante Park Elementary School
 Think College Now Elementary School
 Thornhill Elementary School

Charter schools
 Achieve Academy – Education for Change
 American Indian Public Charter School II
 ASCEND Charter School
 Aspire Berkley Maynard Academy
 Aspire College Academy
 Aspire ERES Academy
 Aspire Monarch Academy
 Aspire Triumph Technology Academy
 Francophone Charter School of Oakland
 KIPP Bridge Academy
 Learning Without Limits Charter School
 Lighthouse Community Charter School
 Lodestar: A Lighthouse Community Public School
 North Oakland Community Charter School
 Roses in Concrete
 Vincent Academy
 Community School for Creative Education
 Cox Academy – Education for Change
 Lazear Charter Academy
 Urban Montessori Charter School
 Yu Ming Charter School

Child development centers
 Webster Academy

Closed schools
 Community Day Elementary School
 Futures Elementary School
 Jefferson Elementary
 Kaiser Elementary 
 Lakeview
 Lazear
 Marshall
 Maxwell Park Elementary School
 Parker K-8 
 Santa Fe
 Tilden Elementary School
 Washington Elementary School (now Sankofa Academy)

https://oaklandside.org/2022/03/15/oakland-school-closures-parker-k-8s-close-knit-community/

References

See also
List of Oakland, California middle schools
List of Oakland, California high schools

 
Oakland elementary schools
Elementary schools